The Blomidon Formation is a unit of Upper Triassic (Norian–Rhaetian) sedimentary rocks, which outcrops in Nova Scotia. It overlies the mainly Carnian Wolfville Formation and underlies the North Mountain Basalt. The type section is exposed between Cape Blomidon and Paddy Island.

References 

Geologic formations of Canada
Triassic Canada
Geology of Nova Scotia